Lisa Rocke (born c.1912) was a German swimmer who set a 200m. world record for breaststroke for women in Berlin on 23 April 1932 with a time of 3 minutes 8.2 seconds. She was from Magdeburg.

References

German female swimmers
Year of birth uncertain
Possibly living people